Raymond Lopes (born December 8, 1962) is an American basketball coach who was most recently an assistant coach at Washington State University. He was the head men's basketball coach at Fresno State from 2002 to 2005, before resigning due to his involvement in the recruiting violations the program committed during his time there.

Coaching career 
Lopes began his coaching career at West Valley Community College as an assistant coach, later going on to coach at Weber State, UC Santa Barbara, Washington State, and Oklahoma.

Fresno State 
Lopes was named the head coach at Fresno State on April 3, 2002, replacing Jerry Tarkanian. In his first season at the helm, he led the Bulldogs to their first outright regular season conference title since 1965 en route to earning conference Coach of the Year honors.

Lopes resigned from Fresno State after the 2004–05 season after it was revealed that he had violated the telephone contact recruiting rule, something that he had also done while as an assistant at Oklahoma. He received a three-year show-cause penalty as a punishment, beginning from his departure from Fresno State.

Post–Fresno State 
Lopes spent one season as a scout with the San Antonio Spurs before joining the Idaho Stampede of the NBA D-League as the associate head coach. He was also an assistant coach at Idaho before returning for another stint at Washington State as an assistant.

Head coaching record

Notes

References 

1962 births
Living people
Sportspeople from New Haven, Connecticut
Sportspeople from Hayward, California
Basketball players from New Haven, Connecticut
Basketball players from California
Basketball coaches from Connecticut
Basketball coaches from California
West Valley Vikings men's basketball players
College of Idaho Coyotes men's basketball players
West Valley Vikings men's basketball coaches
Weber State Wildcats men's basketball coaches
UC Santa Barbara Gauchos men's basketball coaches
Washington State Cougars men's basketball coaches
Oklahoma Sooners men's basketball coaches
Fresno State Bulldogs men's basketball coaches
Idaho Stampede coaches
Idaho Vandals men's basketball coaches